Bowls, also known as Abstraction, Bowls, is a black and white photograph taken by Paul Strand in 1916. It is one the photographs that Strand took back then, inspired by cubism and abstractionism.

History and description
Strand became motivated by the work of Cubist painters and sculptors like Pablo Picasso, Georges Braque and Constantin Brâncuși, to create photographs of objects inspired by their geometrical forms. In this picture, one of several taken during a stay in Twin Lakes, Connecticut, he took a close-up of four regular kitchen bowls. The photograph highlights their circular shapes, and the effect of light and shadows on these objects. The overlapping composition becomes almost abstract and not easily recognizable at first glance. Michael North stated that in this picture "soft focus and composition clearly collude to dilute the referential just enough to make four bowls into a work of art".

Strand geometrical photographs were published at the magazine Camera Work, in 1917, and where praised by Alfred Stieglitz himself, who stated that "The work is brutally direct; devoid of all flim-flam; devoid of trickery and of any 'ism'; devoid of any attempt to mystify an ignorant public, including the photographers themselves."

Public collections
There are prints of this photograph in several public collections, including the Metropolitan Museum of Art, in New York, the National Gallery of Art, in Washington, D.C., the Philadelphia Museum of Art, The Cleveland Museum of Art, and the J. Paul Getty Museum, in Los Angeles.

References

1916 in art
1910s photographs
Black-and-white photographs
Photographs by Paul Strand
Photographs of the Metropolitan Museum of Art
Collections of the National Gallery of Art
Photographs in the collection of the Philadelphia Museum of Art
Photographs of the J. Paul Getty Museum